Gautam-Govinda is a 1979 Indian Hindi-language film made by Subhash Ghai.

Cast
 Shashi Kapoor as Inspector Gautam
 Shatrughan Sinha as Govinda
 Moushumi Chatterjee as Sandhya
 Aruna Irani as Gulabo
 Vijay Arora as Gopala
 Nirupa Roy as Ganga
 Premnath as Dharam Dutt
 Madan Puri as Raja Bhagendra Singh / Bagga
 Reena Roy as Dancer (Special Appearance)

Music

External links

1979 films
1970s Hindi-language films
Films scored by Laxmikant–Pyarelal
Films directed by Subhash Ghai